Vershinino is a rural locality (a village) in Yukseyevskoye Rural Settlement, Kochyovsky District, Perm Krai, Russia. The population was 79 as of 2010.

Geography 
Vershinino is located 29 km north of Kochyovo (the district's administrative centre) by road. Moskvino is the nearest rural locality.

References 

Rural localities in Kochyovsky District